Coelophysis (  traditionally;   or  , as heard more commonly in recent decades) is an extinct genus of coelophysid theropod dinosaur that lived approximately 228 to 201.3 million years ago during the latter part of the Triassic Period from the Carnian and Rhaetian faunal stages in what is now the southwestern United States. Megapnosaurus was once considered a species within this genus, but this interpretation has been challenged since 2017 and the genus Megapnosaurus is now considered valid.

It is one of the earliest known dinosaur genera. Scattered material representing similar animals has been found worldwide in some Late Triassic and Early Jurassic formations.

The type species C. bauri, originally given to the genus Coelurus by Edward Drinker Cope in 1887, was described by the latter in 1889. The names Longosaurus and Rioarribasaurus are synonymous with Coelophysis. Coelophysis is one of the most specimen-rich dinosaur genera.

History of discovery 

The type species of Coelophysis was originally named as a species of Coelurus. Edward Drinker Cope first named Coelophysis in 1889 to name a new genus, outside of Coelurus and Tanystropheus, which C. bauri was previously classified in, for C. bauri, C. willistoni and C. longicollis. An amateur fossil collector working for Cope, David Baldwin, had found the first remains of the dinosaur in 1881 in the Chinle Formation in northwestern New Mexico. Early in 1887, Cope referred the specimens collected to two new species, C. bauri and C. longicollis of the genus Coelurus.  Later in 1887 Cope reassigned the material to a yet another genus, Tanystropheus. Two years later, Cope corrected his classification after realizing differences in the vertebrae, and named Coelophysis, with C. bauri as the type species, which was named for Georg Baur, a comparative anatomist whose ideas were similar to Cope's. The name Coelophysis comes from the Greek words κοῖλος/koilos (meaning 'hollow') and φύσις/physis (meaning 'form'), together "hollow form", which is a reference to its hollow vertebrae. However, the first finds were too poorly preserved to give a complete picture of the new dinosaur. In 1947, a substantial 'graveyard' of Coelophysis fossils was found by George Whitaker, the assistant of Edwin H. Colbert, in New Mexico, at the Ghost Ranch, close to the original find. American Museum of Natural History paleontologist Edwin H. Colbert conducted a comprehensive study of all the fossils found up to that date and assigned them to Coelophysis. The Ghost Ranch specimens were so numerous, including many well-preserved and fully articulated specimens, that one of them has since become the diagnostic, or type specimen, for the entire genus, replacing the original, poorly preserved specimen."Syntarsus" rhodesiensis was first described by Raath (1969) and assigned to Podokesauridae. The taxon "Podokesauridae", was abandoned because its type specimen was destroyed in a fire and can no longer be compared to new finds. Over the years paleontologists assigned the genus to Ceratosauridae (Welles, 1984), Procompsognathidae (Parrish and Carpenter, 1986) and Ceratosauria (Gauthier, 1986). In 2004 "Syntarsus" was found to be synonymous with Coelophysis by Tykoski and Rowe (2004). Ezcurra and Novas (2007) and Ezcurra (2007) also concluded that "Syntarsus" was synonymous with Coelophysis. In a phylogenetic analysis by Ezcurra (2017), Megapnosaurus was recovered in a clade with Segisaurus and Camposaurus, supporting the generic distinction of Megapnosaurus. This was supported by Barta and colleagues in 2018, noting that Coelophysis still bears the vestigial 5th metacarpal, a feature absent in Megapnosaurus.

Description 

Coelophysis was a bipedal, carnivorous, theropod dinosaur and a fast and agile runner. Despite being an early dinosaur, the evolution of the theropod body form had already advanced greatly from creatures like Herrerasaurus and Eoraptor. The torso of Coelophysis conforms to the basic theropod body shape, but the pectoral girdle displays some special characteristics: C. bauri had a furcula (wishbone), the earliest known example in a dinosaur. Coelophysis also preserves the ancestral condition of possessing four digits on the hand (manus). It had only three functional digits, the fourth embedded in the flesh of the hand.

Coelophysis had narrow hips, forelimbs adapted for grasping prey, and narrow feet. Its neck and tail were long and slender. The pelvis and hindlimbs of C. bauri are also slight variations on the theropod body plan. It has the open acetabulum and straight ankle hinge that define the Dinosauria. The hindlimb ended in a three-toed foot (pes), with a raised hallux. The tail had an unusual structure within its interlocking prezygapophysis of its vertebrae, which formed a semi-rigid lattice, apparently to stop the tail from moving up and down.

Coelophysis had a long narrow head (approximately ), with large, forward-facing eyes that afforded it stereoscopic vision and as a result excellent depth perception. Rinehart et al. (2004) described the complete sclerotic ring found for a juvenile Coelophysis bauri (specimen NMMNH P-4200), and compared it to data on the sclerotic rings of reptiles and birds and concluded that Coelophysis was a diurnal, visually oriented predator. The study found that the vision of Coelophysis was superior to most lizards' vision, and ranked with that of modern birds of prey. The eyes of Coelophysis appear to be the closest to those of eagles and hawks, with a high power of accommodation. The data also suggested poor night vision, which would mean this dinosaur had a round rather than a split pupil.

Coelophysis had an elongated snout with large fenestrae which helped to reduce skull weight, while narrow struts of bones preserved the structural integrity of the skull. The neck had a pronounced sigmoid curve. The braincase is known in Coelophysis bauri but little data could be derived because the skull was crushed. Unlike some other theropods, the cranial ornamentation of Coelophysis was not located at the top of its skull. Low, laterally raised bony ridges were present on the dorsolateral margin of the nasal and lacrimal bones in the skull, directly above the antorbital fenestra.

Distinguishing anatomical features 
A diagnosis is a statement of the anatomical features of an organism (or group) that collectively distinguish it from all other organisms. Some, but not all, of the features in a diagnosis are also autapomorphies. An autapomorphy is a distinctive anatomical feature that is unique to a given organism or group.

According to Ezcurra (2007), and Bristowe and Raath (2004) Coelophysis can be distinguished based on the following features: the absence of an offset rostral process of the maxilla; the quadrate is strongly caudally; a small external mandibular fenestra, which is 9–10% of the mandibular length; and the anteroposterior length of the ventral lacrimal process is greater than 30% of its height.

Several paleontologists consider Coelophysis bauri to be the same dinosaur as Megapnosaurus rhodesiensis (formerly Syntarsus), however this has been refuted by the following: Downs (2000) concluded that C. bauri differs from C. rhodesiensis in cervical length, proximal and distal hindlimb proportions and proximal caudal vertebral anatomy; Tykoski and Rowe (2004) concluded that C. bauri differs from M. rhodesiensis in that it lacks a pit at the base of the nasal process of the premaxilla; Bristowe and Raath (2004) concluded that C. bauri differs from M. rhodesiensis in having a longer maxillary tooth row; Barta et al. (2018) concluded that C. bauri differed from M. rhodesiensis in that it bears its 5th metacarpal; and several features in the musculature of the limbs according to Griffin (2018).

Classification 

Coelophysis is a distinct taxonomic unit (genus), composed of one species; C. bauri. Two additional originally described species, C. longicollis and C. willistoni, are now considered dubious and undiagnostic. M. rhodesiensis was referred to Coelophysis for several years, but it is likely its own genus, and is known from the early Jurassic of southern Africa. A third possible species is Coelophysis kayentakatae, previously referred to the genus Megapnosaurus, from the Kayenta Formation of the southwestern US. In recent phylogenetic analyses, "Syntarsus" kayentakatae has been shown to be distantly related to Coelophysis and Megapnosaurus, suggesting that it belongs to its own genus.

In the early 1990s, there was debate over the diagnostic characteristics of the first specimens collected, compared to the material excavated at the Ghost Ranch Coelophysis quarry. Some paleontologists were of the opinion that the original specimens were not diagnostic beyond themselves and, therefore, that the name C. bauri could not be applied to any additional specimens. They therefore applied a different name, Rioarribasaurus, to the Ghost Ranch quarry specimens.

Since the numerous well-preserved Ghost Ranch specimens were used as Coelophysis in most of the scientific literature, the use of Rioarribasaurus would have been very inconvenient for researchers, so a petition was given to have the type specimen of Coelophysis transferred from the poorly preserved original specimen to one of the well-preserved Ghost Ranch specimens. This would make Rioarribasaurus a definite synonym of Coelophysis, specifically a junior objective synonym. In the end, the International Commission on Zoological Nomenclature (ICZN) voted to make one of the Ghost Ranch samples the actual type specimen for Coelophysis and dispose of the name Rioarribasaurus altogether (declaring it a nomen rejectum, or "rejected name"), thus resolving the confusion. The name Coelophysis therefore became a nomen conservandum ("conserved name").

In a situation affecting many dinosaur taxa, some more recently discovered fossils were originally classified as new genera but may be species of Coelophysis. For example, Prof. Mignon Talbot's 1911 discovery which she named Podokesaurus holyokensis, has long been considered to be related to Coelophysis, and some modern scientists consider Podokesaurus a synonym of Coelophysis. Another specimen from the Portland Formation of the Hartford Basin, now at the Boston Museum of Science, has also been referred to Coelophysis. The specimen consists of sandstone casts of a pubis, tibia, three ribs, and a possible vertebra, and probably originated in a quarry in Middletown, Connecticut. However, both the type specimen of Podokesaurus and the Middletown specimen are typically considered indeterminate theropods today.

Sullivan & Lucas (1999) referred one specimen from Cope's original material of Coelophysis (AMNH 2706) to what they thought was a newly discovered theropod, Eucoelophysis. However, subsequent studies have shown that Eucoelophysis was misidentified, and is actually a primitive, non-dinosaurian ornithodiran closely related to Silesaurus.

The genus Syntarsus was named by Raath in 1969 for the type species Syntarsus rhodesiensis from Africa, and later applied to the North American Syntarsus kayentakatae. It was renamed by American entomologist Dr. Michael Ivie (Montana State University of Bozeman), Polish Australian Dr. Adam Ślipiński, and Polish Dr. Piotr Węgrzynowicz (Muzeum Ewolucji Instytutu Zoologii PAN of Warsaw), the three scientists who discovered that the genus name Syntarsus was already taken by a colydiine beetle described in 1869. Many paleontologists did not like the naming of Megapnosaurus, partially because taxonomists are generally expected to allow original authors of a name to correct any mistakes in their work. Raath was aware of the homonymy between the dinosaur Syntarsus and beetle Syntarsus, but the group who published Megapnosaurus were led to believe Raath was deceased and therefore unable to correct his mistake, and proceeded accordingly. Mortimer (2012) pointed out that "Paleontologists might have reacted more positively if the replacement name (Megapnosaurus) hadn't been facetious, translating to "big dead lizard". Yates (2005) analyzed Coelophysis and Megapnosaurus and concluded that the two genera are almost identical, and suggested that Megapnosaurus was possibly synonymous with Coelophysis. In 2004, Raath co-authored two papers in which he argued that Megapnosaurus (formerly Syntarsus) was a junior synonym of Coelophysis. Megapnosaurus was regarded by Paul (1988) and Downs (2000) as being congeneric with Coelophysis. Then in 1993, Paul suggested that Coelophysis should be placed in Megapnosaurus (then known as Syntarsus) to get around the above-mentioned taxonomic confusion. Downs (2000) examined Camposaurus and concluded that it was a junior synonym of Coelophysis, because of its similarity to some of the Coelophysis Ghost Ranch specimens. However, a reassessment of the Camposaurus holotype by Martin Ezcurra and Stephen Brusatte published in 2011 revealed a pair of autapomorphies in the holotype, indicating that C. arizonensis was not a synonym of C. bauri, although it was a close relative of M. rhodesensis. Barta et al. (2018) concluded that C. bauri differed from M. rhodesiensis in that it bears its 5th metacarpal and several features in the musculature of the limbs according to Griffin (2018).

Paleobiology

Feeding 

The teeth of Coelophysis were typical of predatory dinosaurs, blade-like, recurved, sharp and jagged with fine serrations on both the anterior and posterior edges. Its dentition shows that it was carnivorous, probably preying on the small, lizard-like animals that were discovered with it. It may also have hunted in packs to tackle larger prey. Coelophysis bauri has approximately 26 teeth on the maxillary bone of the upper jaw and 27 teeth on the dentary bone of the lower jaw. Carpenter (2002) examined the bio-mechanics of theropod forelimbs and attempted to evaluate their usefulness in predation. He concluded that the forelimb of Coelophysis was flexible and had a good range of motion, but its bone structure suggested that it was comparatively weak. The "weak" forelimbs and small teeth in this genus, suggested that Coelophysis preyed upon animals that were substantially smaller than itself. Rinehart et al. agreed that Coelophysis was a "hunter of small, fast-moving prey". Carpenter also identified three distinct models of theropod forelimb use and noted that Coelophysis was a "combination grasper-clutcher" as compared to other dinosaurs that were "clutchers" or "long armed graspers".

It has been suggested that C. bauri was a cannibal, based on supposed juvenile specimens found "within" the abdominal cavities of some Ghost Ranch specimens. However, Robert J. Gay showed in 2002 that these specimens were misinterpreted. Several specimens of "juvenile coelophysids" were actually small crurotarsan reptiles such as Hesperosuchus. Gay's position was lent support in a 2006 study by Nesbitt et al. In 2009, new evidence of cannibalism came to light when additional preparation of previously excavated matrix revealed regurgitate material in and around the mouth of Coelophysis specimen NMMNH P-44551. This material included tooth and jaw bone fragments that Rinehart et al. considered "morphologically identical" to a juvenile Coelophysis.

In 2010, Gay examined the bones of juveniles found within the thoracic cavity of AMNH 7224, and calculated that the total volume of these bones was 17 times greater than the maximum estimated stomach volume of the Coelophysis specimen. Gay observed that the total volume would be even greater when considering that there would have been flesh on these bones. This analysis also noted the absence of tooth marks on the bones as would be expected in defleshing, and the absence of expected pitting by stomach acids. Finally, Gay demonstrated that the alleged cannibalized juvenile bones were deposited stratigraphically below the larger animal that had supposedly cannibalized them. Taken together these data suggested that the Coelophysis specimen AMNH 7224 was not a cannibal and that the bones of the juvenile and adult specimens were found in their final position as a result of "coincidental superposition of different sized individuals.

Pack behavior 

The discovery of over 1000 specimens of Coelophysis at the Whitaker quarry at Ghost Ranch, has suggested gregarious behavior to researchers like Schwartz and Gillette. There is a tendency to see this massive congregation of animals as evidence for huge packs of Coelophysis roaming the land. No direct evidence for flocking exists; the deposits only indicate that large numbers of Coelophysis, along with other Triassic animals, were buried together. Some of the evidence from the taphonomy of the site indicates that these animals may have been gathered together to feed or drink from a depleted water hole or to feed on a spawning run of fish, and then became buried in a catastrophic flash flood or a drought.

With 30 specimens of C. rhodesiensis found together in Zimbabwe some palaeontologists have suggested that Coelophysis was indeed gregarious. Again there is no direct evidence of flocking in this case and it has also been suggested that these individuals were also victims of flash flooding as it appears to have been commonplace during this period.

Growth and sexual dimorphism 
Rinehart (2009) assessed the ontogenic growth of this genus using data gathered from the length of its upper leg bone (femur) and concluded that Coelophysis juveniles grew rapidly, especially during the first year of life. Coelophysis likely reached sexual maturity between the second and third year of life and reached its full size, just above 10 feet in length, by its eighth year. This study identified four distinct growth stages: 1-year, 2-year, 4-year, and 7+ year. It was also thought, that as soon as they were hatched, they would have to fend for themselves.

Two "morphs" of Coelophysis have been identified: a more gracile form, as in specimen AMNH 7223, and a slightly more robust form, as in specimens AMNH 7224 and NMMNH P-42200. Skeletal proportions were different between these two forms; the gracile form has a longer skull, a longer neck, shorter forelimbs, and has sacral neural spines that are fused; and the robust form has a shorter skull, a shorter neck, longer forelimbs, and unfused sacral neural spines. Historically, many arguments have been made that this represents some sort of dimorphism in the population of Coelophysis, probably sexual dimorphism. Raath agreed that dimorphism in Coelophysis is evidenced by the size and structure of the forelimb. Rinehart et al. studied 15 individuals, and agreed that two morphs were present, even in juvenile specimens, and suggested that sexual dimorphism was present early in life, prior to sexual maturity. Rinehart concluded that the gracile form was female and the robust form was male based on differences in the sacral vertebrae of the gracile form, which allowed for greater flexibility for egg laying. Further support for this position was provided by an analysis showing that each morph comprised 50% of the population, as would be expected in a 50/50 sex ratio.

However, more recent research has found that C. bauri and C. rhodesiensis had highly variable growth between individuals, with some specimens being larger in their immature phase than smaller adults were when completely mature; this indicates that the supposed presence of distinct morphs is simply the result of individual variation. This highly variable growth was likely ancestral to dinosaurs but later lost, and may have given such early dinosaurs an evolutionary advantage in surviving harsh environmental challenges.

Reproduction 
Through the compilation and analysis of a database of nearly three dozen birds and reptiles, and comparison with existing data about the anatomy of Coelophysis Rinehart et al. (2009) drew the following conclusions. It was estimated that average egg of Coelophysis was 31–33.5 millimeters across its minor diameter, and that each female would lay between 24 and 26 eggs in each clutch. The evidence suggested that some parental care was necessary to nurture the relatively small hatchlings during the first year of life, where they would reach 1.5 meters in length by the end of their first growth stage. Coelophysis bauri invested as much energy in reproduction as other extinct reptiles of its approximate size.

Paleopathology 
In a 2001 study conducted by Bruce Rothschild and other paleontologists, 14-foot bones referred to Coelophysis were examined for signs of stress fracture, but none were found.

In C. rhodesiensis, healed fractures of the tibia and metatarsus have been observed, but are very rare. "[T]he supporting butresses of the second sacral rib" in one specimen of Syntarsus rhodesiensis showed signs of fluctuating asymmetry. Fluctuating asymmetry results from developmental disturbances and is more common in populations under stress and can therefore be informative about the quality of conditions a dinosaur lived under.

Ichnology 

Edwin H. Colbert has suggested that the theropod footprints referred to the ichnogenus Grallator, located in the Connecticut River Valley across Connecticut and Massachusetts, may have been made by Coelophysis. The footprints are from the Late Triassic to Early Jurassic aged Newark Supergroup. They clearly show digits II III and IV but not I or V. That condition is strange for footprints of their age. The digits I and V were presumed to be stubby and ineffective, not touching the ground when the dinosaur was walking or running. They have been thought to be from an unidentified, primitive saurischian similar to Coelophysis by David B. Weishampel and L. Young more recently. Skeletal remains resembling Coelophysis have also been found in the valley, supporting the idea that a species similar to Coelophysis is responsible for the footprints.

Paleoenvironment 

Specimens of Coelophysis have been recovered from the Chinle Formation of New Mexico and Arizona, more famously at the Ghost Ranch (Whitaker) quarry in the Rock Point member among other quarries in the underlying Petrified Forest member, the sediments of which have been dated to approximately 212 million years ago, making them part of the middle Norian stage of the Late Triassic, but Thomas Holtz Jr. interpreted that it was during the Rhaetian stage from approximately 204 to 201.6 million years ago.

C. rhodesiensis has been recovered in the Upper Elliott Formation in the Cape and Free State provinces of South Africa as well as the Chitake River bonebed quarry at the Forest Sandstone Formation in Zimbabwe.

Ghost Ranch was located close to the equator over 200 million years ago, and had a warm, monsoon-like climate with heavy seasonal precipitation. Hayden Quarry, a new excavation site at Ghost Ranch, New Mexico, has yielded a diverse collection of fossil material that included the first evidence of dinosaurs and less-advanced dinosauromorphs from the same time period. The discovery indicates that the two groups lived together during the early Triassic period 235 million years ago.

Therrien and Fastovsky (2001) examined the paleoenvironment of Coelophysis and other early theropods from Petrified Forest National Park in Arizona, and determined that this genus lived in an environment that consisted of floodplains marked by distinct dry and wet seasons. There was a great deal of competition during drier times when animals struggled for water in riverbeds that were drying up.

In the upper sections of the Chinle Formation where Coelophysis is found, dinosaurs were rare; so far only Chindesaurus and Daemonosaurus are known, the terrestrial fauna being dominated instead by other reptiles like the rhynchocephalian Whitakersaurus; the pseudosuchian Revueltosaurus; the aetosaurs Desmatosuchus, Typothorax and Heliocanthus; the crocodilomorph Hesperosuchus; the "rauisuchians" Shuvosaurus, Effigia and Vivaron; along other rare components like the dinosauriform Eucoelophysis, and the amniote Kraterokheirodon. In the waterways there are the phytosaur Machaeroprosopus; the archosauromorph Vancleavea; the amphibians Apachesaurus and Koskinonodon; and the fishes Reticulodus, Arganodus and Lasalichthyes.

Taphonomy 
The multitude of specimens deposited so closely together at Ghost Ranch was probably the result of a flash flood, which swept away a large number of Coelophysis and buried them quickly and simultaneously. In fact, it seems that such flooding was commonplace during this period of the Earth's history and, indeed, the Petrified Forest of nearby Arizona is the result of a preserved log jam of tree trunks that were caught in one such flood. Whitaker quarry at Ghost Ranch is considered a monotaxic site because it features multiple individuals of a single taxon. The quality of preservation and the ontogenic (age) range of the specimens helped make Coelophysis one of the best known of all genera. In 2009, Rinehart et al. noted that in one case the Coelophysis specimens were "washed into a topographic low containing a small pond, where they probably drowned and were buried by a sheet flood event from a nearby river."

The 30 specimens of C. rhodesiensis found together in Zimbabwe was also probably the result of a flash flood, which swept away a large number of Coelophysis and buried them quickly and simultaneously as well.

Cultural significance 
Coelophysis was the second dinosaur in space, following Maiasaura (STS-51-F). A Coelophysis skull from the Carnegie Museum of Natural History was aboard the Space Shuttle Endeavour mission STS-89 when it left the atmosphere on 22 January 1998. It was also taken onto the space station Mir before being returned to Earth.

As being over 100 years old, Coelophysis is one of the best-known dinosaurs in literature. It was designated as the official state fossil of New Mexico in 1981, and is now the logo of the New Mexico Museum of Natural History.

References

External links 

Coelophysis  in the Dino Directory

Coelophysoids
Late Triassic dinosaurs of North America
Chinle fauna
Triassic geology of New Mexico
Paleontology in New Mexico
Symbols of New Mexico
Fossil taxa described in 1889
Taxa named by Edward Drinker Cope